A tepui , or tepuy, is a table-top mountain or mesa found in South America, especially in Venezuela and western Guyana. The word tepui means "house of the gods" in the native tongue of the Pemon, the indigenous people who inhabit the Gran Sabana.

Tepuis tend to be found as isolated entities rather than in connected ranges, which makes them the host of a unique array of endemic plant and animal species. Some of the most outstanding tepuis are  Auyantepui, Autana, Neblina, and Mount Roraima. They are typically composed of sheer blocks of Precambrian quartz arenite sandstone that rise abruptly from the jungle, giving rise to spectacular natural scenery. Auyantepui is the source of Angel Falls, the world's tallest waterfall.

Morphology 

These table-top mountains are the remains of a large sandstone plateau that once covered the granite basement complex between the north border of the Amazon Basin and the Orinoco, between the Atlantic coast and the Rio Negro. This area is part of the remnants of the supercontinent Gondwana. Throughout the course of the history of Earth, the plateau began to erode and fragment about 300 million years ago, and about 70 million years ago the tepuis were formed from the remaining monadnocks.

There are 115 such mesas in the Gran Sabana in the south-east of Venezuela on the border with Guyana and Brazil, where the highest concentration of tepuis is found.

 
Because of their great age, some tepuis exhibit surface features and caves typical of karst topography, formed in more water-soluble rocks such as limestone. Caves here include the  Abismo Guy Collet, the deepest quartzite cave in the world. These sinkholes are formed when the roofs of tunnels carved by underground rivers collapse.

Flora and fauna 

The plateaus of the tepuis are completely isolated from the ground forest, making them ecological islands. The altitude causes them to have a different climate from the ground forest. The top presents cool temperatures with frequent rainfall, while the bases of the mountains have a tropical, warm and humid climate. The isolation has led to the presence of endemic flora and fauna through evolution over millennia of a different world of animals and plants, cut off from the rest of the world by the imposing rock walls. Some tepui sinkholes contain species that have evolved in these "islands within islands" that are unique to that sinkhole. The tepuis are often referred to as the Galápagos Islands of the mainland, having a large number of unique plants and animals not found anywhere else in the world. The floors of the mesas are poor in nutrients, which has led to a rich variety of carnivorous plants, such as Drosera and most species of Heliamphora, as well as a wide variety of orchids and bromeliads. The weathered, craggy nature of the rocky ground means no layers of humus are formed.

It has been hypothesized that endemics on tepuis represent relict fauna and flora that underwent vicariant speciation when the plateau became fragmented over geological time. However, recent studies suggest that tepuis are not as isolated as originally believed. For example, an endemic group of treefrogs, Tepuihyla, have diverged after the tepuis were formed; that is, speciation followed colonization from the lowlands.

The tepuis, also known as 'islands above the rainforest', are a challenge for researchers, as they are home to a high number of new species that have yet to be described. A few of these mountains are cloaked by thick clouds for nearly the entire year. Their surfaces could previously only be photographed by helicopter radar equipment.

Many tepuis are in the Canaima National Park in Venezuela, which has been classified as a World Heritage Site by UNESCO.

Selected tepuis 

A few of the most notable of the 60 tepuis:

Angel Falls, the highest waterfall in the world, drops from a cleft in the summit.
 Mount Roraima, also known as Roraima Tepui. A report by the noted South American researcher Robert Schomburgk inspired the Scottish author Arthur Conan Doyle to write his novel The Lost World about the discovery of a living prehistoric world full of dinosaurs and other primordial creatures. The borders of Venezuela, Brazil, and Guyana meet on the top.
 Matawi Tepui, also known as Kukenán, because it is the source of the Kukenán River, is considered the "place of the dead" by the local Pemon Peoples. Located next to Mount Roraima in Venezuela.
A unique cave runs from one side of the mountain to the other.
They harbour an ecosystem composed of unique plant and animal species at the bottom.
 Ilú-Tramen Massif is the most northerly mountain in the chain that stretches along the Venezuelan-Guyana border from Roraima in the south.

Popular culture 
The hypothesis that endemic fauna and flora of tepuis represent remnants of ancient species was an inspiration to Arthur Conan Doyle's novel The Lost World (1912), which was set on a tepui.

In the 1990 film Arachnophobia, a new species of spider with a highly potent, deadly venom that lives in social colonies and is the implied apex predator of its environment is discovered in a sinkhole enclosed by a tepui in the Venezuelan rainforest, also alluding to the unique ecological conditions of tepuis.

Much of the story of 2009 Pixar–Disney film Up takes place among the tepuis. The film also includes depictions of the numerous rock formations and an Angel Falls-like waterfall called "Paradise Falls".

In a scene near the beginning of Disney's "Dinosaur", a pteranodon flies over tepuis.

Steve Backshall was part of the first expedition to successfully climb Mount Upuigma. The expedition was part of the program Lost Land of the Jaguar on BBC One in 2008. On the summit they discovered an endemic species of frog and mouse, and also footprints of an unidentified mammal.

In the novel The 6th Extinction (2014) by James Rollins, a tepui in the north of Brazil was featured as a secret lair for the villain Dr. Cutter Elwes.

See also

References 
Citations

Bibliography

 Much of the text of this article comes from the corresponding German-language Wikipedia article, retrieved on 16 February 2006, which uses the following sources:
 Uwe George: Inseln in der Zeit. GEO - Gruner + Jahr AG & Co., Hamburg, .
 Roland Stuckardt: Sitze der Götter. terra - Heft 3/2004, Tecklenborg Verlag, Steinfurt.
 National Geographic Magazine, May 1989, "Venezuela's Islands in Time," pp. 526–561

External links 

 The Making of the Tepuis Film : "The Living Edens : The Lost World"
 Mongabay.com – pictures from Tepuis in Venezuela.

 
.
.
.
.
Erosion landforms
Mesas
Tables (landform)
Oronyms
Natural history of South America
Flora of northern South America
Ecoregions of South America
Ecoregions of Brazil
Ecoregions of Guyana
Ecoregions of Suriname
Ecoregions of Venezuela
Neotropical tropical and subtropical moist broadleaf forests
Montane forests